Ajaltoun is a town and municipality in the Keserwan District of the Keserwan-Jbeil Governorate in Lebanon. It is located 24 km (15 miles) north of Beirut. Ajaltoun's average elevation is 850 meters (2800') above sea level and its total land area is 612 hectares (1510 acres). The municipality consists of a twelve-member council, which as of 2008 was headed by Clauvise Khazen. In addition to the municipal council, two mukhtars (headmen), Georges Fersan and Antoine Harouni, also serve the town. The Virgin Mary Church, built by the Khazen sheikhs in 1647, the Saint Nicolas Church and the Mar Shalita Monastery are located in Ajaltoun. The town was also the site of fighter plane crash during World War I.

Etymology

Ajaltoun's name comes from the Arabic root word ′aajel, which could mean "calf", "to roll" or "wheel". An alternative theory for the town's etymology are that it originates from the Phoenician word for "statue" or "round area".

History
Ottoman tax records indicate Ajaltoun had 23 Christian households and three bachelors in 1523, 19 Muslim households and one bachelor in 1530, and 19 Christian households in 1543. The Khazen family of Ballouneh in Keserwan settled in the village in 1606.

Demographics
Ajaltoun had an estimated population of 10 000, who live in a total of 2,500 homes and operate 175 businesses. In 2009, there were 2,524 registered voters in the town. Most of the inhabitants are Maronite Catholics, although there are minorities of Melkite Catholics and Greek Orthodox Christians. The principal families in relative order of size are Sfeir, Ghosn, Harouni, Khalife, Mdawar, Zoghbi, Mrad, Ghanem, Khazen, Abi Chaker and Kassis.

Economy
The main source of income in Ajaltoun is derived from tourism, and there are four hotels and seven restaurants in the town. An annual festival dedicated to Saint Zakhia is held in Ajaltoun in the last days of August.

Education
There are five schools in Ajaltoun, including Ajaltoun Public School, Mar Mansour Sisters for Charity and the Ajaltoun Foundation for Arts. The Antonine International School, an institute for higher education, is also located in Ajaltoun.

References

Bibliography

Populated places in Keserwan District
Eastern Orthodox Christian communities in Lebanon
Maronite Christian communities in Lebanon
Melkite Christian communities in Lebanon